Nauman Mahmood HI(M) is lieutenant general in the Pakistan Army currently serving as the 35th President of National Defence University since 23 November 2021. His previous assignments includes Commanding Officer (CO) of an Infantry Regiment and Chief of Staff (COS) of a Corps. He also served as General Officer Commanding (GOC) of an Infantry Division in North Waziristan District and finally Director General  Inter-Services Intelligence (DG-ISI (A) Analysis) as a two star before getting promoted to a Lieutenant General . He was appointed to the General Headquarters as Inspector General for Communication & Information Technology Branch at Rawalpindi.

Biography 
Raja Nauman Mahmood hails from Rawalpindi, where he lived in Shaheed Army Officers Colony, Sabzazar. He went to St. Mary's Academy Lalazar. Mahmood was commissioned in the Pakistan Army on 11 September 1987. He graduated from the Pakistan Command and Staff College, Command and Staff College, Egypt and the National Defence University, Islamabad.

As an instructor, he was appointed as chief instructor, senior instructor and instructor class A at the Command and Staff College.

Belonging to the Baloch Regiment, he was promoted to the rank of lieutenant general in April 2019. He was subsequently appointed as commander of the XI Corps in December 2019 until he was preceded by Lieutenant General Faiz Hameed on 23 November 2021.

References 

Living people
Pakistani generals
National Defence University, Pakistan alumni
Graduates of the Staff College, Quetta
People of Inter-Services Intelligence
Recipients of Hilal-i-Imtiaz
Date of birth missing (living people)
Place of birth missing (living people)
Year of birth missing (living people)